The Pagoda is a novelty building, built atop the south end of Mount Penn overlooking Reading, Pennsylvania, United States. It has been a symbol of the city for more than a century.

History
Completed in 1908 at a cost of $50,000, this pagoda was intended to be the hotel/restaurant centerpiece of a luxury resort. It is now part of the Mount Penn Preserve,  of municipally-owned land.

Within the top story hangs a tocsin, a massive bell cast in Obata, Mie Prefecture, Japan, in 1739, and formerly installed in a Buddhist temple in either Ogose or Hannō, Saitama Prefecture, just north of Tokyo. Listed on the bell's sides in Japanese characters are the names of its 48 donors and a prophecy about the end of time. The temple was closed in 1881, and later destroyed.

Anti-Japanese sentiment was rampant during World War II, and there were calls to demolish the building. But it was restored in 1949, with the lower story and balconies rebuilt in stone. In 1960, neon lights were installed outlining its roofs. In the 1970s, the Japanese garden was restored, and Japanese cherry trees were planted around the building. LED lights were installed in 2008-09. A webcam on its third floor periodically records and publishes the weather atop Mount Penn.

The Pagoda is owned by the City of Reading but is managed and preserved by the Foundation for the Reading Pagoda. It houses a small café and a gift shop, and functions as an icon for the City of Reading. The Pagoda is also the home of Pagoda Skyline, Inc., a non-profit volunteer organization formed in 1969 to help with the restoration and preservation of the Pagoda, the William Penn Memorial Fire Tower and Skyline Drive.

It was added to the National Register of Historic Places in 1972.

See also
National Register of Historic Places listings in Berks County, Pennsylvania

References

External links
The Reading Pagoda
Pagoda Skyline, Inc.

Buildings and structures in Reading, Pennsylvania
Tourist attractions in Reading, Pennsylvania
Buildings and structures completed in 1908
Pagodas in the United States
Novelty buildings in Pennsylvania
1908 establishments in Pennsylvania
Towers in Pennsylvania